Swamp Ophelia is the fifth studio album by the Indigo Girls, released in 1994.

Track listing

Personnel
Indigo Girls
Amy Ray - vocals, acoustic and electric guitar (lead on Fugitive, rhythm elsewhere)
Emily Saliers - vocals, acoustic, classical and electric guitar (rhythm and lead), bouzouki
Musicians
Jerry Marotta - drums (all except 10 & 11), percussion, bongos, African drums, marimba
Sara Lee - bass (all except 9-11)
Michael Lorant - drums (11), guest/backing vocals (1, 2, 4, 8, 11)
Jan Dykes - bass (6, 11)
Danny Thompson - acoustic bass (4, 5, 7, 8)
Tony Levin - Chapman stick (9)
Chuck Leavell - piano (1, 3, 5), chimes (1)
John Mark Painter - baritone guitar (1), flugelhorn (1, 5, 6), accordion (2), string arrangement (6, 11), electric guitar (11)
Mike Batt - string and woodwind arrangement, conductor on "The Wood Song"
Connie Grauer - melodica, bass synthesizer (9)
Kim Zick - triangle, snare, tom tom, timpani (9)
Lisa Germano - penny whistle (1), mandolin (1, 4, 5), violin (4, 7, 8)
Jane Scarpantoni, Anthony Lamarchina - cello
Jo-El Sonnier - accordion (2)
Bill Newton - chromatic harmonica (5)
James Hall - trumpet (1, 6)
David Davidson, Sheila Doyle, Christian Teal - violin
Kristin Wilkinson - viola
Jane Siberry (3), The Roches (4, 8), Sam "Shake" Anderson (5), Larry Ray Sr. (9) - backing vocals

Reception
The Allmusic review noted that "Amy Ray and Emily Saliers continue to hone their signature lush melodies .... The Indigo Girls are no longer afraid to hit upon past relationships and personal emotion. Saliers and Ray's incredible harmonies are most stylish .... [b]ut the duo also move beyond the sweet and tender by dipping into darker realms .... This album is another humanistic effort from the Indigo Girls' deep and indwelling passions and ideas."

In 2015, the Indigo Girls were invited by Justin Vernon of Bon Iver to perform Swamp Ophelia in its entirety at the inaugural Eaux Claires festival, which Vernon founded. Vernon has written that Swamp Ophelia was one of his sister Kim's favorite albums, and after she urged him to listen to it, it became one of his as well.

Covers
In 2009, Michael Feinstein covered "The Power of Two" in his nightclub act and studio album The Power of Two with Cheyenne Jackson, using the song's title for both the album and act as well. In 2010, Filipino pop rock singer Aiza Seguerra also covered the song. In 2012, Filipino acoustic pop singer Nyoy Volante and his acoustic band, "Rhythmic Circle" also covered the song on the OPM pop compilation album 90's Music Comes Alive.

References

1994 albums
Indigo Girls albums
Albums produced by Peter Collins (record producer)
Epic Records albums